Taxitheliella is a genus of moss in family Pylaisadelphaceae. 

It contains the following species (but this list may be incomplete):
 Taxitheliella richardsii, Dixon

References 

Moss genera
Hypnales
Taxonomy articles created by Polbot